Momauk Township is a township of Bhamo District in the Kachin State of Burma. The principal town is Momauk.

Townships of Kachin State